Logan Blake Alexander (born June 10, 1986) is a Bermudian international footballer who played in the Bermudian Premier Division, Major Indoor Soccer League, USL Premier Development League, and the Canadian Soccer League.

Club career
Alexander played college soccer with the UAB Blazers before returning to Bermuda to play for North Village Rams. He turned professional when he signed with National Indoor Soccer League side Baltimore Blast. He then had a spell at Bermuda Hogges before returning to North Village. In 2012, he went overseas to Canada to sign with Brantford Galaxy of the Canadian Soccer League.

International career
Alexander made his debut for Bermuda in a January 2004 friendly match against Barbados and earned a total of 3 caps, scoring no goals.

His final international was a November 2006 Gold Cup qualification match against Saint Vincent & the Grenadines.

Personal life
He is a son of Jackie Blake and Judith Alexander.

References

External links

 

1986 births
Living people
People from Southampton Parish, Bermuda
Association football defenders
Bermudian footballers
Bermuda international footballers
UAB Blazers men's soccer players
North Village Rams players
Baltimore Blast (2008–2014 MISL) players
Bermuda Hogges F.C. players
Brantford Galaxy players
USL League Two players
Major Indoor Soccer League (2008–2014) players
Bermudian expatriate footballers
Expatriate soccer players in the United States
Canadian Soccer League (1998–present) players
Bermudian expatriate sportspeople in the United States
Expatriate soccer players in Canada
Bermudian expatriate sportspeople in Canada